Ocak in Alevism (literally meaning "hearth") is the particular religious community which Alevi adherents belong to. In Alevi tradition, leaders of each ocak (dedes) are assumed to be descended from sayyids.

Structuring 
Ocaks are interconnected and there is a familial connection between them. At the top of the family tree is Haji Bektash Veli. There are people descended from every ocak. The Dedes which are the older sons of ocaks are in a higher position then the younger sons. This hierarchical structure is part of the "Hand in hand, Haqq" mentality.

There are Dede ocaks in Turkey whose hierarchy has not been established due to the lack of research. The most well-known example is the Şücaeddin Veli.

References 

Alevism